Matthew August Langwell (born May 6, 1986) is an American former professional baseball pitcher. He played in Major League Baseball (MLB) in 2013 for the Cleveland Indians and Arizona Diamondbacks.

Amateur career
Langwell attended Rice University. In 2007, he played collegiate summer baseball with the Wareham Gatemen of the Cape Cod Baseball League.

Professional career

Cleveland Indians
Langwell was drafted by the Cleveland Indians in the 11th round of the 2008 Major League Baseball Draft. He was called up to the majors for the first time on June 1, 2013. He was optioned back to the Triple-A Columbus Clippers on June 18.

Arizona Diamondbacks
The Arizona Diamondbacks received Langwell on September 1 as the player to be named later in the August 30, 2013 trade for Jason Kubel. He was outrighted off the roster on October 3, 2013. He was released on March 17, 2014.

References

External links

Rice Owls bio

1986 births
Living people
People from Bryan, Texas
Baseball players from Texas
Cleveland Indians players
Arizona Diamondbacks players
Sam Houston Bearkats baseball players
Rice Owls baseball players
Mahoning Valley Scrappers players
Lake County Captains players
Kinston Indians players
Akron Aeros players
Columbus Clippers players
Somerset Patriots players
Wareham Gatemen players